Mormon Tavern is a former stage stop in El Dorado County, California.

The place was founded in 1849. It served as a stop on the Pony Express from 1860 to 1861. There is no certain account of how the place got its name, which is quite incongruous: Mormons (Latter Day Saints) typically don't drink alcohol (as would be served in a tavern).

The site is now registered as California Historical Landmark #699.

References

Pony Express stations
California Historical Landmarks
1849 establishments in California